The Atlantic silverside (Menidia menidia), also known as spearing in the northeastern United States, is a small species of fish from the West Atlantic, ranging from the Gulf of St. Lawrence in Canada to northeastern Florida in the USA. It is one of the most common fish in the Chesapeake Bay and in the Barnegat Bay. It is a common subject of scientific research because of its sensitivity to environmental changes.

It eats smaller (biotic) animals and plants – small crustaceans, algae, annelid worms, shrimp, zooplankton, copepods, amphipods, squid, and insects.

The Atlantic silverside's predators are larger predatory fish – striped bass, blue fish, Atlantic mackerel – and many water birds, including egrets, terns, cormorants, and gulls.

The abiotic factors the Atlantic silverside needs to survive varies for populations of fish based on their geographical location.

The Atlantic silverside's habitat is generally near the water's edge. They are mostly found swimming in brackish waters, such as in the mouths of rivers and streams that connect to the ocean. These small schooling fish have been seen to gather in seagrass beds, which can harbor the nearly defenseless fish some form of shelter from predation as well as provide safe haven for spawning. During winter, most Atlantic silversides swim in deeper water to avoid cold/low temperature. During the summer, most are found in the shallows along the shoreline.

The Atlantic silverside's defense is to hide in seagrass beds. They are also quick swimmers and their coloration of silver and a little white makes it confusing to predators to determine the direction the fish are heading. The silverside's strongest form of defense is the strength-in-numbers strategy, where fish will school in large numbers to diminish their chances of being the one picked off by a predator.

References

 Tagatz, M. E., and D. L. Dudley. 1961. Seasonal occurrence of marine fishes in four shore habitats near Beaufort, North Carolina, 1957-1960. U. S. Fish Wildl. Serv. Spec. Sci. Rep. Fish. 390. 19 pp.

External links
 Life Histories and Environmental Requirements of Coastal Fishes and Invertebrates (Mid-Atlantic): Atlantic Silverside
 Further information
 Inland Silverside, Menidia beryllina, Photo and Information at MBL Aquaculture

Atherinopsidae
Fish described in 1766
Taxa named by Carl Linnaeus